The Denmark women's national beach handball team is the national team of Denmark. It is governed by the Danish Handball Federation and takes part in international beach handball competitions.

Results

World Championships

World Games

World Beach Games

References

External links
Official website
IHF profile

Beach handball
Women's national beach handball teams
Beach handball